Murray Hill Hotel may refer to:

 Murray Hill Hotel (Murray Isle), New York, US
 Murray Hill Hotel (Park Avenue), New York, US